Kuttyedathi is a 1971 Malayalam language film, directed by P. N. Menon and written by M. T. Vasudevan Nair. It was widely regarded as one of the best South Indian films made in the 1970s. Crew - Music: M. S. Baburaj, Cinematography: Ashok Kumar, Operative cameraman: P. S. Nivas and editing: Ravi Kiran. Kuttyedathi is woven around the life of a girl, who is an ugly duckling with tomboyish tendencies, and who is continuously discriminated against in favour of her prettier younger sister. The film was shot at Shoranur.

Cast
 Sathyan as Appunni
 S. P. Pillai as Govindan Nair
 Jayabharathi as Janu
 Jeassy
 Kuttyedathi Vilasini as Malu (Kuttiyedathi)
 Master Sathyajith as Vasu
 Kuthiravattam Pappu as Kuttishankaran
 Raman Menon
 Ammini
 Balan K. Nair
 Nilambur Balan as Karuthan
 Philomina as Narayani
 Kozhikode Shantha Devi as Meenakshi

Soundtrack 
The music was composed by M. S. Baburaj and the lyrics were written by Swathi Thirunal and Sreekumaran Thampi.

References

External links
 
 Kuttiyedathi at the Malayalam Movie Database

1970s Malayalam-language films
Films with screenplays by M. T. Vasudevan Nair
Films directed by P. N. Menon (director)